The men's 60 kg competition in judo at the 1992 Summer Olympics in Barcelona was held on 2 August at the Palau Blaugrana. The gold medal was won by Nazim Huseynov of the Unified Team.

Results

Main brackets

Pool A

Pool B

Repechages

Repechage A

Repechage B

Final

Final classification

References

External links
 

M60
Judo at the Summer Olympics Men's Extra Lightweight
Men's events at the 1992 Summer Olympics